Kie Aïcha Charlotte Millogo (born 14 July 1998), known as Charlotte Millogo, is a Burkinabé footballer who plays as a defender for US des Forces Armées and captains the Burkina Faso women's national team.

Club career
Millogo has played for USFA in Burkina Faso.

International career
Millogo capped for Burkina Faso at senior level during the 2022 Africa Women Cup of Nations qualification).

Personal life
Millogo is also a police sergeant.

References

External links

1998 births
Living people
People from Bobo-Dioulasso
Burkinabé women's footballers
Women's association football defenders
US des Forces Armées players
Burkina Faso women's international footballers
Women police officers